The Parma Sandstone is a geologic formation in Michigan. It preserves fossils dating back to the Carboniferous period.

References
 

Carboniferous Michigan
Mississippian United States
Pennsylvanian Series